Henry Brandon (born Heinrich von Kleinbach; 8 June 1912 – 15 February 1990) was an American film and stage character actor with a career spanning almost 60 years, involving more than 100 films; he specialized in playing a wide diversity of ethnic roles.

Early life
Brandon was born in 1912 in Berlin, Germany, the son of Hildegard and Hugo R. von Kleinbach, a merchant. His parents emigrated to the United States while he was still an infant. After attending Stanford University, where he was a member of the Alpha Sigma Phi fraternity, he trained as a theatre actor at the Pasadena Community Playhouse and subsequently performed on Broadway, continuing to return to the stage periodically throughout his career.

Film career
He made his motion picture debut in 1932 as an uncredited spectator at the Colosseum in The Sign of the Cross. In the Victorian-era stage melodrama The Drunkard — played for laughs in a popular local revival — Kleinbach appeared as the wizened old villain "Squire Cribbs". The 22-year-old Kleinbach was so convincing in elderly makeup that he fooled movie producer Hal Roach, who hired Kleinbach to play Silas Barnaby, the villain in the Laurel and Hardy feature Babes in Toyland. In 1936, having until then been performing under his real name, he adopted the stage name of Henry Brandon. He reprised the Barnaby character in Roach's short-subject production Our Gang Follies of 1938. 

In the late 1930s Brandon became a familiar face in adventure serials, almost always in villainous roles. In 1940, he had his only starring film role, as the imperious Fu Manchu in the Republic Pictures serial Drums of Fu Manchu. The serial was withdrawn at the express request of the State Department in 1941 after the U.S. entry into World War II out of concern that it was inciting anti-Chinese sentiment in the American public, which conflicted both with the interests of the Chinese-American population and the international relationship with China as an allied power in the war against Japan.

Character actor
Henry Brandon was a versatile character player, often called upon to portray various ethnic types. He played the character of Renouf, a deserter from the French Foreign Legion, in the 1939 remake of Beau Geste. In 1943, he played Major Ruck, a British secret agent in the guise of an SS officer in Edge of Darkness. In 1948 he appeared as Giles de Rais in Joan of Arc. He appeared as the African tribal chieftain M'Tara in Tarzan and the She-Devil (1953), and a French army captain in Vera Cruz (1954). 

In 1956, in one of his most famous credits, he played the chief villain, a Comanche chieftain called Scar, in John Ford's The Searchers. The following year he portrayed Jesse James in Hell's Crossroads. In 1958, he portrayed Acacius Page in Auntie Mame. In 1959, he played the role of Gator Joe in "Woman in the River" in the crime drama Bourbon Street Beat. On October 12, 1959 he played the role of Jason in Euripides' Medea as a part of the Play of the Week television series.

In 1960, he played a Native American character again as Running Wolf in the episode "Gold Seeker" in the television series The Rebel. He played Asian characters in two 1961 episodes, viz. "Angel of Death" and "The Assassins", of the television series Adventures in Paradise and played an American Indian chieftain again in John Ford's Two Rode Together. In 1965, he played the Shug chief in the pilot episode of F Troop and made a guest appearance on the TV programme Honey West "A Matter of Wife and Death" (episode 4).

Personal life
Brandon married in 1941; the marriage produced one son before ending in 1946. He subsequently had a long relationship with the actor Mark Herron. Herron left Brandon in the mid-1960s, and was briefly the fourth husband of Judy Garland.  Herron and Garland separated after five months of marriage, after which Herron returned to Brandon and remained with him until Brandon's death.

Death
Brandon lived in West Hollywood in his final years. He suffered a heart attack and died on 15 February 1990, at the age of 77, at Cedars-Sinai Hospital in Los Angeles. His body was cremated, and the ashes were reportedly scattered at an undisclosed theatre location.

Selected filmography

 The Sign of the Cross (1932) as Colosseum Spectator (uncredited)
 Babes in Toyland (1934) as Silas Barnaby
 The Trail of the Lonesome Pine (1936) as Wade Falin
 The Preview Murder Mystery (1936) as The Bat Man (uncredited)
 Big Brown Eyes (1936) as Don Butler 
 The Garden of Allah (1936) as Hadj
 Killer at Large (1936) as Mr. Zero
 Black Legion (1937) as Joe Dombrowski
 Jungle Jim (1937, Serial) as The Cobra
 Secret Agent X-9 (1937, Serial) as Blackstone
 I Promise to Pay (1937) as Henchman Fancyface
 Island Captives (1937) as Dick Bannister
 The Last Train from Madrid (1937) as Radio Announcer (uncredited)
 West Bound Limited (1937) as Joe Forbes
 Conquest (1937) as Staff Officer (uncredited)
 Wells Fargo (1937) as Larry (uncredited)
 I Met My Love Again (1938) as Bruno - the Painter (uncredited)
 Three Comrades (1938) as Valentin - Man with Eye Patch (uncredited)
 Spawn of the North (1938) as Davis (uncredited)
 If I Were King (1938) as Soldier (uncredited)
 The Last Express (1938) as Henchman Pinky
 The Last Warning (1938) as Willie the Creep (uncredited)
 Pirates of the Skies (1939) as Gang Pilot (uncredited)
 Buck Rogers (1939, Serial) as Captain Laska
 Beau Geste (1939) as Renouf - Another Deserter
 Conspiracy (1939) as Carlson - Crewman
 Nurse Edith Cavell (1939) as Lt. Schultz
 The Marshal of Mesa City (1939) as Duke Allison
 Geronimo (1939) (scenes deleted)
 Drums of Fu Manchu (1940) as Dr. Fu Manchu
 Half a Sinner (1940) as Handsome
 Ski Patrol (1940) as Jan Sikorsky
 Florian (1940) as Groom (uncredited)
 The Ranger and the Lady (1940) as General Augustus Larue
 Doomed to Die (1940) as Attorney Victor Martin
 Under Texas Skies (1940) as Tom Blackton
 Dark Streets of Cairo (1940) as Hussien
 The Son of Monte Cristo (1940) as Lt. Schultz
 Underground (1941) as Rolf
 Two in a Taxi (1941) as Professor
 The Shepherd of the Hills (1941) as Bald Knobber (uncredited)
 Hurricane Smith (1941) as Sam Carson
 Bad Man of Deadwood (1941) as Ted Carver
 The Corsican Brothers (1941) as Marquis de Raveneau (uncredited)
 Night in New Orleans (1942) as Croupier (uncredited)
 Edge of Darkness (1943) as Maj. Ruck (uncredited)
 Northwest Outpost (1947) as Chinese Junk Captain (uncredited)
 Old Los Angeles (1948) as Larry Stockton
 Canon City (1948) as Freeman
 Hollow Triumph (1948) as Big Boy (uncredited)
 Joan of Arc (1948) as Captain Gilles de Rais
 The Paleface (1948) as Wapato (medicine man)
 Wake of the Red Witch (1948) as Kurinua (uncredited)
 The Fighting O'Flynn (1949) as Lt. Corpe
 Tarzan's Magic Fountain (1949) as Siko
 Cattle Drive (1951) as Jim Currie
 The Golden Horde (1951) as Juchi, Son of Genghis Khan
 Flame of Araby (1951) as Malik
 Harem Girl (1952) as Hassan Ali
 Scarlet Angel (1952) as Pierre
 Wagons West (1952) as Clay Cook
 Hurricane Smith (1952) as Sam
 The War of the Worlds (1953) as Cop at Crash Site
 Scared Stiff (1953) as Pierre
 Pony Express (1953) as Joe Cooper
 Raiders of the Seven Seas (1953) as Captain Goiti
 Tarzan and the She-Devil (1953) as M'Tara, Locopo Chief
 The Caddy (1953) as Mr. Preen
 War Arrow (1953) as Maygro
 Knock on Wood (1954) as Second Trenchcoat Man
 Casanova's Big Night (1954) as Capt. Rugello
 Vera Cruz (1954) as Capt. Danette
 Lady Godiva of Coventry (1955) as Bejac
 Silent Fear (1956) as Cliff Sutton
 Comanche (1956) as Black Cloud
 The Searchers (1956) as Chief Cicatriz (Scar)
 Bandido (1956) as Gunther
 The Ten Commandments (1956) as Commander of the Hosts
 Hell's Crossroads (1957) as Jesse James
 The Land Unknown (1957) as Dr. Carl Hunter
 Omar Khayyam (1957) as Commander
 The Buccaneer (1958) as British Major
 Auntie Mame (1958) as Acacius Page
 Okefenokee (1959) as Joe Kalhari
 The Big Fisherman (1959) as Menicus
 Two Rode Together (1961) as Chief Quanah Parker
 Captain Sindbad (1963) as Colonel Kabar
 So Long, Blue Boy (1973) as Buck
 The Manhandlers (1974) as Carlo
 When the North Wind Blows (1974) as Avakum
 Assault on Precinct 13 (1976) as Sgt. Chaney
 Run for the Roses (1977) as Jeff
 Mission to Glory: A True Story (1977) as Father Canion
 Bud and Lou (1978, TV Movie) as Bernie
 Hollywood Knight (1979) as Curley
 Evita Peron (1981, TV Movie) as General Ramirez
 To Be or Not to Be (1983) as Nazi Officer
 Wizards of the Lost Kingdom II (1989) as Zarz (final film role)

Selected theatre performances

Ramona (California, 1946 & 1947)

Medea (New York, 1949)
Twelfth Night (Broadway, 1949)
The Lady's Not For Burning (New York, 1957)
Arsenic and Old Lace (Florida, 1985)

References
Notes

Sources
Theatre appearances taken from a New York Times obituary, February 22, 1990.
Other information compiled from Classic Move Hub and IMDb

Further reading
 Cassara, B. & Greene, R., "Henry Brandon: King of the Bogeymen" (Pub. BearManor Media, 2018).
Scapperotti, Dan. "Memories of Fu Manchu". Starlog (Jan 1987), 60-64. Article about Brandon's movie career.

External links

1912 births
1990 deaths
American male film actors
Bisexual male actors
Bisexual men
German emigrants to the United States
Male actors from Berlin
Male actors from Los Angeles
20th-century American male actors
American male stage actors
Stanford University alumni
LGBT people from California
German LGBT actors
20th-century American LGBT people
American bisexual actors